Botrychium matricariifolium (orth.var. B. matricariaefolium) is a species of fern in the Ophioglossaceae family. It is referred to by the common names chamomile grape-fern, daisyleaf grape-fern, and matricary grape-fern. It is native to Europe and parts of eastern North America, including eastern Canada and parts of the United States.

This fleshy fern grows up to 30 centimeters tall. It produces dull green sterile leaf blades up to 10 centimeters long by 9 wide divided into a few pairs of segments. The fertile leaves are a bit longer and bear the spores.

Rarity 
This species is very rare in most European countries. In Ukraine in total, there were recorded 17 loci: 10 before 1980, after 1980 – 7, as before and after 1980 – 0 location.

References

External links
USDA Plants Profile - Botrychium matricariifolium

matricariifolium
Ferns of Europe
Ferns of the Americas
Plants described in 1843
Taxa named by Alexander Braun
Taxa named by Wilhelm Daniel Joseph Koch